The 2020–21 season is Guadalajara's fourth competitive season and fourth season in the Liga MX Femenil, the top flight of Mexican women's football.

Due to the COVID-19 pandemic, Liga MX Femenil's start was delayed for August 2020.

On 23 July 2020, manager Ramón Villa Zevallos was fired due to differences between him and the club's management, regarding the "players' development". He was replaced by Édgar Mejía, who previously played for Guadalajara and achieved a league championship in 2006.

Squad

Apertura
{| class="wikitable" style="text-align:center; font-size:100%;"
|-
! style=background-color:#CD1731;color:#FFFFFF| No.
! style=background-color:#CD1731;color:#FFFFFF| Nat.
! style=background-color:#CD1731;color:#FFFFFF| Name
! style=background-color:#CD1731;color:#FFFFFF| Date of birth (Age)
! style=background-color:#CD1731;color:#FFFFFF| Since
|-
! colspan="5" style="background:#02172F; color:#FFFFFF; text-align:center;" | Goalkeepers
|-
| 1 ||  || align=left| Celeste Espino ||  || 2019
|-
| 12 ||  || align=left| Blanca Félix ||  || 2017
|-
| 25 ||  || align=left| María Fernanda Ayala ||  || 2020
|-
! colspan="5" style="background:#02172F; color:#FFFFFF; text-align:center;" | Defenders
|-
| 2 ||  || align=left| Jaqueline Rodríguez ||  || 2019
|-
| 3 ||  || align=left| Miriam García ||  || 2017
|-
| 4 ||  || align=left| Janelly Farías ||  || 2019
|-
| 13 ||  || align=left| Daniela Pulido ||  || 2017
|-
| 14 ||  || align=left| Andrea Sánchez ||  || 2017
|-
| 16 ||  || align=left| Priscila Padilla ||  || 2017
|-
| 20 ||  || align=left| Dayana Madrigal ||  || 2020
|-
| 26 ||  || align=left| Araceli Torres ||  || 2018
|-
| 27 ||  || align=left| Kinberly Guzmán ||  || 2018
|-
| 35 ||  || align=left| Damaris Godínez ||  || 2018
|-
! colspan="5" style="background:#02172F; color:#FFFFFF; text-align:center;" | Midfielders
|-
| 6 ||  || align=left| Miriam Castillo ||  || 2018
|-
| 7 ||  || align=left| María Sánchez ||  || 2020
|-
| 8 ||  || align=left| Nicole Pérez ||  || 2018
|-
| 10 ||  || align=left| Tania Morales (Captain) ||  || 2017
|-
| 15 ||  || align=left| Carolina Jaramillo ||  || 2020
|-
| 18 ||  || align=left| Susan Bejarano ||  || 2017
|-
| 22 ||  || align=left| Isabella Gutiérrez ||  || 2020
|-
| 28 ||  || align=left| Michelle González ||  || 2017
|-
| 30 ||  || align=left| Samara Alcalá ||  || 2019
|-
| 34 ||  || align=left| Victoria Acevedo ||  || 2017
|-
! colspan="5" style="background:#02172F; color:#FFFFFF; text-align:center;" | Forwards
|-
| 9 ||  || align=left| Evelyn González ||  || 2020
|-
| 11 ||  || align=left| Norma Palafox ||  || 2017
|-
| 17 ||  || align=left| Joseline Montoya ||  || 2019
|-
| 19 ||  || align=left| Anette Vázquez ||  || 2017
|-
| 23 ||  || align=left| Guadalupe Velázquez ||  || 2017
|-
| 24 ||  || align=left| Alicia Cervantes ||  || 2020
|-
| 29 ||  || align=left| Gabriela Huerta ||  || 2018
|-
| 31 ||  || align=left| Lía Romero ||  || 2017
|-
| 33 ||  || align=left| Yashira Barrientos ||  || 2019

Transfers

In

Out

Coaching staff

Competitions

Overview

Torneo Apertura

League table

Matches

Playoffs

Quarterfinals

Torneo Clausura

League table

Matches

Playoffs

Quarterfinals

Semifinals

Final

Statistics

Goalscorers

Hat-tricks

References

C.D. Guadalajara (women) seasons
Mexican football clubs 2020–21 season